Aquaumbra is a monotypic genus of corals belonging to the monotypic family Aquaumbridae. The only species is Aquaumbra klapferi.

The species is found in Central America.

References

Aquaumbridae
Octocorallia genera
Monotypic cnidarian genera